Ryan Huska (born July 2, 1975) is a Canadian former professional ice hockey player who played in the NHL. He was drafted in the 3rd round, 76th overall, in the 1993 NHL Entry Draft by the Chicago Blackhawks. In 1997–98, he played his only NHL game with the Blackhawks against the Calgary Flames. He played 5:51 in 8 shifts. As a junior player with the Kamloops Blazers, he won 3 Memorial Cups in 1992, 1994, and 1995.

He has spent the last several seasons as an assistant coach with the WHL Kelowna Rockets and was named the Rockets seventh head coach in history in the summer of 2007, when former coach Jeff Truitt was named an assistant with the AHL Springfield Falcons. In 2009, with Huska coaching, the Rockets won the Ed Chynoweth Cup as WHL champions, and advanced to the Memorial Cup, where they lost in the final to the Windsor Spitfires. Huska was re-appointed for his fifth year in charge prior to the 2011–12 season.

On June 23, 2014, Huska was named the head coach of the Adirondack Flames of the American Hockey League, the affiliate of the Calgary Flames in the NHL. He stayed on as coach when the Adirondack franchise was relocated to become the Stockton Heat in 2015. In 2018, he was hired by the Calgary Flames as an assistant coach.

Career statistics

See also
List of players who played only one game in the NHL

References

External links

1975 births
Living people
Calgary Flames coaches
Canadian ice hockey centres
Canadian ice hockey coaches
Chicago Blackhawks draft picks
Chicago Blackhawks players
Ice hockey people from British Columbia
Indianapolis Ice players
Kamloops Blazers players
Kelowna Rockets coaches
Lowell Lock Monsters players
Sportspeople from Cranbrook, British Columbia
Springfield Falcons players